"Those Nights" is a song by English indie pop band Bastille. It was released on 4 June 2019 as the fourth single from their third studio album, Doom Days (2019). The song was written by Dan Smith, who handled the production along with Mark Crew.

Background
The song takes place at 05:46 in the morning. The song's lyrics explore the meaning of relationships and the desire to find a loving companion when the world seems to be falling apart.

Music video
A music video to accompany the release of "Those Nights" was first released onto YouTube on 4 June 2019 at a total length of four minutes and thirty-eight seconds. The video shows Dan Smith singing the song on an old sofa surrounded by a pile of unconscious bodies.

Track listing

Charts

Release history

References

Songs about nights
2019 songs
2019 singles
Bastille (band) songs
Songs written by Dan Smith (singer)